Rød Front ('Red Front') was a Norwegian newspaper, published in Hamar in Hedmark county.

History and profile
Rød Front was started as a weekly newspaper in 1932 as the Communist Party of Norway organ in the vicinity. It went defunct already in October/November 1933. It had a predecessor in Arbeideren, which had stopped in 1929.

References

1932 establishments in Norway
1933 disestablishments in Norway
Communist Party of Norway newspapers
Defunct newspapers published in Norway
Defunct weekly newspapers
Mass media in Hamar
Norwegian-language newspapers
Publications established in 1932
Publications disestablished in 1933